The 1999 Eye Group British Open Championships was held at the Aberdeen Exhibition Centre, with the early rounds and qualifying at the Aberdeen Squash Rackets Club, from 6–12 December 1999. Jonathon Power won the title defeating Peter Nicol in the final. Nicol was forced to retire at one game all due to illness. He spent three days on a drip at Aberdeen Royal Infirmary after suffering from food poisoning. The illness was caused by Nicol ordering a take-out pasta dish in his home town.

Seeds

Draw and results

Final Qualifying round

Main draw

References

Men's British Open Squash Championships
Men's British Open
Men's British Open Squash Championship
Men's British Open Squash Championship
Men's British Open Squash Championship
20th century in Aberdeen
Sports competitions in Aberdeen